Paul Arthur Griffin (born January 20, 1954) is an American former professional basketball player in the National Basketball Association (NBA).

Education and professional career
Paul Griffin attended Shelby High School in Shelby, Michigan, a small town in western Michigan near Lake Michigan.  Griffin was the integral part on back-to-back class C Boys' Basketball State Championships in 1971 and 1972.

Griffin attended Western Michigan University from 1972 to 1976, leading the Broncos to their first NCAA basketball tournament berth in 1976 and an appearance in the Sweet Sixteen.  He finished his career as WMU's all-time leading rebounder.

Griffin was selected by the New Orleans Jazz in the fifth round of the 1976 NBA draft, where he spent three seasons. He was acquired by the San Antonio Spurs for the 1979–80 season and remained there until the end of his NBA career in 1983. During the 1980s, Griffin and his Spurs teammates George Johnson, Dave Corzine, Kevin Restani, Mark Olberding and Reggie Johnson earned the nickname "The Bruise Brothers" for their physical style of play.

See also
 1975–76 Western Michigan Broncos men's basketball team

References

External links
 NBA stats @ basketballreference.com

1954 births
Living people
American men's basketball players
Basketball players from Michigan
New Orleans Jazz draft picks
New Orleans Jazz players
People from Oceana County, Michigan
San Antonio Spurs players
Small forwards
Western Michigan Broncos men's basketball players